Matej Medveď (3 July 1996 – 25 July 2020) was a Slovak sport shooter who competes in the men's 10 metre air rifle. He competed for Slovakia at the 2019 Summer Universiade in Naples, Italy and 2019 European Games in Minsk, Belarus.

Death
Medveď died unexpectedly after a shooting competition in Košice aged 24. He was buried on 30 July 2020, in his hometown Brezno.

References

Slovak male sport shooters
1996 births
2020 deaths
Shooters at the 2019 European Games
European Games competitors for Slovakia
Sportspeople from Brezno
Medalists at the 2019 Summer Universiade
Universiade bronze medalists for Slovakia
Universiade medalists in shooting